Santa Isabel, Mexico may refer to:
 Santa Isabel, Baja California
 Santa Isabel, Chihuahua